The Cat and the Canary is a 1922 stage play by John Willard, adapted at least four times into feature films, in 1927, 1930, 1939, and again in 1979. The original stage play opened on Broadway February 7, 1922.

Plot

The story concerns the death and inheritance of old Cyrus West, a rich eccentric who felt that his relatives "have watched my wealth as if they were cats, and I — a canary".  He decrees that his will be read 20 years after his death, at which point his relatives converge at his old family home, now a spooky old haunted mansion.

The will reads that his most distant relative still bearing the name of West be sole heir, provided they are legally sane. The rest of the night spent in the house calls into question the sanity of Annabelle West, a fragile young woman who is legally Cyrus West's heir.

Production
Produced by Kilbourn Gordon and directed by Ira Hards, The Cat and the Canary premiered February 7, 1922, at the National Theatre. It ran 349 performances, closing December 2, 1922. The three-act mystery made a return engagement of 40 performances (April 23 – May 26, 1923).

Cast

 Percy Moore as Roger Crosby
 Blanche Friderici as "Mammy" Pleasant
 John Willard as Harry Blythe
 Beth Franklyn as Susan Sillsby
 Jane Warrington as Cicely Young
 Ryder Keane as Charles Wilder
 Henry Hull as Paul Jones
 Florence Eldridge as Annabelle West
 Edmund Elton as Hendricks
 Harry D. Southard as Patterson

Publication
The Cat and the Canary was published by Samuel French in 1921.

Adaptations
 1927: The 1927 silent version, directed by Paul Leni, and stars Laura La Plante as Annabelle West.
 1930: The 1930 version, made under the title The Cat Creeps is now considered a lost film. The Cat Creeps was Universal's first horror film with sound and dialogue, predating its classic Universal horror films like Frankenstein (1931), Dracula (1931), and The Invisible Man (1933).
 1939: The 1939 version, directed by Elliott Nugent, stars Bob Hope, Paulette Goddard, and Gale Sondergaard. This version is mainly comedic.  Universal, who owned the rights to the play, sold them to Paramount Pictures for this production. The film, along with the 1940 film The Ghost Breakers, was an inspiration to Walt Disney for his Haunted Mansion attraction at Disneyland.
 1960: On 27 September 1960, a one-hour version of the play was presented on Dow Hour of Great Mysteries on NBC Television.
 1979: The 1979 British version, written and directed by Radley Metzger, stars Honor Blackman, Michael Callan, Edward Fox, Wendy Hiller, Olivia Hussey, Wilfred Hyde-White, Beatrix Lehmann, Carol Lynley, Daniel Massey, and Peter McEnery.
 2020: A stage production starring Britt Ekland, Mark Jordon, Tracy Shaw, Marti Webb, Gary Webster, Ben Nealon, Nikki Patel and Eric Carte.

References

External links
 

1922 plays
Broadway plays
American plays adapted into films